The 2023 Richmond Kickers season will be the club's 31st season of existence, their fifth season in USL League One, and their 19th season in the third tier of American soccer. The Kickers will be led by fourth-year head coach, Darren Sawatzky. The USL League One season will start on March 18, 2023.

Background 

The 2022 season' was the club's 30th season of existence, and their fourth season in USL League One. The Kickers were led by third-year head coach, Darren Sawatzky. The Kickers had their strongest regular season showing since 2013, winning the USL League One regular season title, finishing the season with 51 total points, five clear of second place, with 14 wins, seven losses, and nine draws. Striker, Emiliano Terzaghi, for the third season, led the Kickers and USL League One in goals with 18 goals. 

Outside of USL League One, the Kickers participated in the 2022 U.S. Open Cup, and the 2022 USL League One Playoffs, for their first-place finish during the regular season. The Kickers reached the fourth round of the Open Cup, before losing to Major League Soccer expansion side, Charlotte FC. The Kickers will begin the Playoffs in the semifinal round on October 29, where they were eliminated.

Transfers

Transfers  in

Transfers  out

Non-competitive

Preseason exhibitions

Competitions

USL League One

Table

U.S. Open Cup

Statistics

Appearances and goals

. Numbers after plus–sign (+) denote appearances as a substitute.

|}

References

External links 
 Richmond Kickers

Richmond Kickers seasons
Richmond Kickers
Richmond Kickers
Richmond Kickers
Kickers